The 2015 Vietnamese National Football Third League was the 11th season of the Vietnamese National Football Third League. The season began on 17 November 2015 and finished on 10 December 2015.

Rule 
In this season, there were 10 teams divided in two groups in qualifying stage according to geographic region. Two best teams in each group qualified to final stage. In final stage, 4 teams played three matches: 
 Match 1: Group A winner vs Group B runner-up
 Match 2: Group B winner vs Group A runner-up
 Match 3: Match 1 loser vs Match 2 loser
The winners of three matches promoted to 2016 Vietnamese National Football Second League. But in season 2016, Trẻ Đồng Nai withdrew, so the loser of match 3 also promoted.

Team changes 
The following teams have changed division since the 2014 season.

To Vietnamese Third League 
Relegated from Vietnamese Second League
 none

From Vietnamese Third League 
Promoted to Vietnamese Second League
 Mancons Sài Gòn
 Bình Định

Qualifying stage

Group A
All matches played in Hà Nam Stadium, Hà Nam.

Group B
All matches played in Thành Long Stadium, Ho Chi Minh City.

Final round

Match 1

Match 2

Match 3

References 

2015 in Vietnamese football